Lyle Jeffs is the brother of Warren Jeffs and a bishop in the Fundamentalist Church of Jesus Christ of Latter-Day Saints, commonly referred to as the FLDS Church. He has been referred to as his brother's "special counselor" in some church documents.

Jeffs was the FLDS bishop for both Hildale, Utah, and Colorado City, Arizona. According to The Salt Lake Tribune, he was removed from office in 2012. He was convicted  and sentenced in 2017 to five years in prison for orchestrating a welfare fraud scheme.

Lyle is the son of the late FLDS prophet Rulon Jeffs. Lyle is also the uncle of author and ex-FLDS member Brent W. Jeffs.

Legal issues
On  April 9, 2015, U.S. District Judge David Sam held Lyle Jeffs in contempt of court. In 2012 the United States Department of Labor began an investigation into the role of the FLDS Church and Jeffs in suspected child labor violations.  A CNN report claimed that children were used to harvest nuts at the Southern Utah Pecan Ranch in 2012.  Judge Sam ruled that Lyle Jeffs and his brother Nephi disobeyed subpoenas requiring them to answer questions from Labor Department investigators.

On April 20, 2015, the U.S. Department of Labor assessed fines totaling $1.96 million against a group of FLDS church members, including Lyle Jeffs, for alleged labor violations during the church's 2012 pecan harvest at an orchard near Hurricane, Utah.

Jeffs allegedly escaped house arrest in June 2016 by slipping out of an FBI ankle bracelet.

On June 14, 2017, Jeffs was arrested by the FBI in Yankton, South Dakota.

On September 20, 2017, Jeffs pleaded guilty as part of a plea deal to one count of defrauding the Supplemental Nutrition Assistance Program (SNAP) one count of failure to appear in court, while a money laundering charge was dismissed. Jeffs was sentenced on December 13, 2017, to nearly 5 years of prison, 3 years of probation, and $1 million in restitution. He was monitored by the Phoenix Residential Reentry Management field office, and was released on March 15, 2021.

Notes

American Latter Day Saint leaders
Fundamentalist Church of Jesus Christ of Latter-Day Saints members
Mormon fundamentalist leaders
Mormon fundamentalists
Place of birth missing (living people)
Religious leaders from Utah
Religious leaders from Arizona
1960 births
Living people
People from Short Creek Community